The 2016 season is the inaugural season of the Sacramento Express.

2016 season

Ladder

Ladder progression

Sacramento
21st century in Sacramento, California
2016 in sports in California